Stuart W. Risch is a United States Army lieutenant general who is currently the 41st Judge Advocate General of the United States Army. He was previously the Deputy Judge Advocate General of the United States Army and before that the commanding general of the United States Army Legal Services Agency.

Early life and education
Raised in Orange and West Orange, New Jersey, Risch graduated from the Newark Academy in 1980. He received his Bachelor of Arts in government, law and history from Lafayette College in 1984. Risch participated in Lafayette's Reserve Officers' Training Corps program and was commissioned as a field artillery officer the same year. He received his Juris Doctor from Seton Hall University School of Law in 1987. While in law school, he was a platoon leader, executive officer and company commander in the 78th Infantry Division, U.S. Army Reserve. He entered active duty service as a member of the Judge Advocate General's Corps in 1988.

Career
He received his LL.M. degree from The Judge Advocate General's Legal Center and School in 1996. He also completed a master's degree in strategic studies at the Army War College in 2007.

In June 2021, he was nominated for promotion to lieutenant general and assigned to replace Charles N. Pede as the Judge Advocate General of the US Army. He assumed his present rank on July 12, 2021, with his promotion ceremony taking place on July 16, 2021.

References

External links
 

Year of birth missing (living people)
Living people
Place of birth missing (living people)
Newark Academy alumni
Lafayette College alumni
Seton Hall University School of Law alumni
New Jersey lawyers
The Judge Advocate General's Legal Center and School alumni
United States Army War College alumni
Recipients of the Legion of Merit
United States Army generals
People from Orange, New Jersey
People from West Orange, New Jersey
Military personnel from New Jersey